Phineas Selig (1856–1941) was a New Zealand journalist, newspaper editor and manager, sports administrator. He was born in Melbourne, Victoria, Australia in 1856.

References

1856 births
1941 deaths
Journalists from Melbourne
Australian emigrants to New Zealand
Australian Jews
Australian editors
Australian magazine editors
Australian journalists
New Zealand editors
New Zealand magazine editors
New Zealand Jews
New Zealand journalists